La bella y las bestias is a Spanish-language television series that follows the life of Isabela León, a beautiful and hard-working woman who returns to Mexico with a goal: to find those responsible who murdered her parents years ago.  It is produced by W Studios y Lemons Films for Univision and Televisa and premiered on 12 June 2018, concluding on 10 September 2018. It is an original series created and developed by Juan Camilo Ferrand that consists of eighty episodes. It stars Esmeralda Pimentel and Osvaldo Benavides.

Plot 
The series revolves around Isabela León (Esmeralda Pimentel), a beautiful young girl whose parents were murdered by a group of white-collar criminals when she was a minor. After reaching the age of majority, Isabela, with great resentment, decides to take charge of her situation and face the murderers of her parents, whom she calls Bestias, members of high society, who hide their crimes under facades of legal businesses or activities. In the company of her great fighting companions, Mike (Jorge Alberti) and Penélope (Cassandra Sánchez Navarro), Isabela returns from Los Angeles to Mexico to hunt, one by one, the Bestias that do not stop enjoying the honeys of impunity.

Cast and characters

Main characters 

 Esmeralda Pimentel as Isabela León: better known as Bela by her relatives, she is a young Mexican woman and more importantly the daughter of Enrique León. Isabela practices mixed martial arts and knows how to handle weapons. After the death of her parents and the kidnapping of her best friend María. Isabela begins to find a way to prepare to destroy all those who destroyed her life, this is how she meets Juan Pablo son of Armando Quintero, one of the main people in charge of ordering the death of his father Enrique, thanks to Juan Pablo who he teaches Isabela a video, she manages to recognize the murderers of her parents and begins to call them Bestias. So with the help of Penélope and Mike begins to train and together with them two begin to create a plan to end Las Bestias.
 Osvaldo Benavides as Juan Pablo Quintero: He is the son of Armando and Gloria Quintero, and the older brother of Emilia Quintero. Juan Pablo suffers from constant abuse and humiliation from his father, since he wants to turn him into a murderer and a corrupt businessman. Juan Pablo out of resentment records a video of his father and his partners in which he shows how everyone orders the death of Enrique León. After this he decides to give notice to the authorities, but it is too late. During his imprisonment in the bobeda where his father keeps all his money, he meets Isabela and helps her discover who was responsible for the death of his family. Upon finding his father dead, Juan Pablo decides to enter the recruitment to be a federal police officer.
 Cassandra Sánchez Navarro as Penélope Zapata: She is a young woman who practices boxing with Mike and lives in the orphanage where Emanuel takes Isabela to live. When she meets Isabela, she starts to treat her badly, but one day during lunch, she starts to fight with some companions and Isabela decides to help her. After this Penelope decides to help Isabela in her plan of revenge against those who murdered her family.
 Arturo Barba as Emanuel Espitia: He is Isabela's godfather, and the director of the Interpol. He is known as Bestia 8, although his identity remains a secret to Isabela. He is another of those who ordered the death of Enrique León, he uses his work as director of the Interpol to do illicit business. He maintained a hidden relationship with María, Isabela's friend, and left her pregnant.
 Jorge Alberti as Mike: He is a former Navy Marine of the United States expert in mixed martial arts and Machiavellian mind that helps Isabela to train for the battle that awaits her against the Beasts that in the past murdered her parents. Mike has a gym where only men practice since he is prohibited from women training in his gym because his wife was killed while practicing.
 Sebastián Martínez as Antonio José Ramos: Better known as El Colombiano or Bestia 4. Behind his facade as a happy and amusing immigrant who pretends to be an importer and exporter of Colombian underwear is a man who is dedicated to the trafficking of women.
 Sebastián Ferrat as Ignacio Vega: He is the father of Daniel and Marcia Vega. Also better known as Bestia 6 or El Cafetero. Owner of huge amounts of land where he grows coffee, which he himself exports and distributes throughout the Mexican Republic, enjoys killing the weak.
 Víctor Civeira as Ricardo
 Jaume Mateu as Simón Narváez: He is Juan Pablo's partner during his training as a recruit to be a federal police officer. He and Juan Pablo are in charge of destroying Las Bestias.
 Elizabeth Minotta as Andrea
 Ari Telch as Armando Quintero: Better known as Bestia 1 is the father of Juan Pablo and Emilia Quintero. He often recruits beautiful women, including famous actresses or hostesses, to seduce them with their money and get them to agree to sleep with him.
 Guillermo Quintanilla as Abelardo Zea: Better known as Bestia 7. It is the senator of the Mexican Republic is an unscrupulous man who wants to become president at all costs.
 Leticia Huijara as Gloria Quintero: She is the mother of Juan Pablo and Emilia Quintero. She is the wife of Armando Quintero, Gloria is an alcoholic who takes due to the problems she faces with her family.
 Francisco de la O as Horacio Hernández: Better known as Bestia 2. He is the corrupt president of a delegation in Mexico City.
 Aylín Mújica as Roberta "La Madame" González: Better known as Bestia 3. She owns an escort service, is a woman full of aesthetic surgeries that is obsessed with beauty and youth.
 Jessica Mas as Isadora Hernández "La Joyera": Better known as Bestia 5. Her life changed years ago when she married a millionaire man and owner of a jewelry chain that she ends up inheriting and later using to launder money.

 Fermín Martínez as Ernesto Acosta "El Cástor": He is an assassin who worked for Armando Quintero, and by orders of him he murdered Isabela's parent.
 Macarena Achaga as Emilia Quintero

Recurring characters 
 Alejandro Durán as Norman, he is the companion of El Cástor, he started working for Armando Quintero, but then he and El Cástro decided to start working for Emanuel, who makes them partners of the casino.
 Jessica Díaz as María, is the best friend of Isabela, after his kidnapping it is revealed that she was pregnant. But Emanuel, realizing this, decides to keep her kidnapped and then murders her.
 David Palacio as Daniel Vega, Ignacio's nephew.
 Ivana de María as Marcia Vega, Ignacio's daughter.
 Raúl Olivo as Jorge
 Sofía Blanchet as Veronica Roldán

Production 
The production of the series began on June 26, 2017. Altair Jarabo was initially chosen as the female lead in the series, but later for unknown reasons, Televisa announced that the female lead would be Esmeralda Pimentel.

Ratings 
 
}}

Episodes

References

External links 
 

Univision original programming
Las Estrellas original programming
Spanish-language television shows
Spanish-language telenovelas
Television series produced by Lemon Films
Television series produced by W Studios
American telenovelas
Televisa original programming
2018 telenovelas
2018 American television series debuts
2018 Mexican television series debuts
2018 American television series endings
2018 Mexican television series endings
Mexican telenovelas
Television shows set in Mexico City
Television shows set in Los Angeles
Television shows set in Mexico
Television shows set in California
Television shows filmed in Los Angeles
Television shows filmed in California
Television shows filmed in Mexico
Fictional portrayals of the Los Angeles Police Department